Bónus is an Icelandic no-frills low-cost supermarket chain owned by Hagar.  Bónus operates 31 stores in Iceland and seven in the Faroe Islands. It follows the no-frills format of limited hours, simple shelves and having a giant fridge instead of chiller cabinets. Offering a large variety of food.

Opening Hours: Vary from most of them being 10 AM to 8 PM, (10:00-20:00). While other shops are 10 AM to 7 PM. (10:00-19:00)

Special Opening Hours, these opening hours are found in Kringlan, Egilsstaðir, Ísafjörður.

Special Opening Hours are from: Kringlan,

(Mon-Thu, 11 AM to 7 PM, 11:00 - 19:00), 

(Fri-Sun, 10 AM to 7 PM, 10:00 - 19:00), 

Egilsstaðir, & Ísafjörður,  

(Mon-Thu, 11 AM to 6:30 PM, 11:00 - 18:30), 

(Fri, 10 AM to 7 PM, 10:00 - 19:00), 

(Sat & Sun, 10 AM to 6 PM, 10:00 - 18:00)

Source: https://bonus.is/opnunartimar/

Locations: Fiskislóð, Garðatorg, Helluhraun, Holtagarðar, Hraunbær, Kauptún, Kauptún, Kringlan, Lóuhólar,

Mosfellsbær, Nýbýlavegur, Skeifan, Skipholt, Skútuvogur, Smáratorg, Spöngin, Tjarnarvellir, Ögurhvarf, 

Akranes, Borgarnes, Egilsstaðir, Fitjar - Reykjanesbæ, Hveragerði, Ísafjörður, Langholt - Akureyri,

Naustahverfi - Akureyri, Norðurtorg - Akureyri, Selfoss, Stykkishólmur, Túngata - Reykjanesbæ,  Vestmannaeyjar.

These are all of the locations besides Faroe Islands.

Source: https://bonus.is/finna-verslun/

History 
Bónus was started by Jón Ásgeir Jóhannesson and his father, Jóhannes Jónsson, with the first store in Skútuvogur street in Reykjavík in April, 1989. Within just a few years, the chain became the biggest supermarket chain in Iceland. In 1992, another Icelandic supermarket, Hagkaup, bought a 50% stake, and in 1993, Hagkaup and Bónus established a joint purchasing company named Baugur. In 1994, the company made its first investment in Faroe Islands.

Bónus and Hagkaup are now both owned by Baugur Group's subdivision Hagar.

References

External links

Bónus (Iceland) website (in Icelandic)
Bónus (Faroe Islands) website (in Faroese)

No frills
Supermarkets of Iceland
Retail companies established in 1989
1989 establishments in Iceland
Companies based in Reykjavík
1990s establishments in the Faroe Islands